Buddhist Religious Welfare Trust is an autonomous government body that is responsible for the welfare of the Buddhist community in Bangladesh and is located in Dhaka, Bangladesh.

History
Buddhist Religious Welfare Trust was established in 1984. It was placed under the Ministry of Religious Affairs. It is headquartered in Kamalapur Dharmarajika Bauddha Vihara in Kamalapur, Dhaka. The trust was established under the Buddhist Religious Welfare Trust Ordinance, 1983. The trust received 30 million taka from the government for its 2012 budget.

References

Government agencies of Bangladesh
1984 establishments in Bangladesh
Religious organisations based in Bangladesh
Organisations based in Dhaka
Buddhism in Bangladesh